The 2019 Northern Ireland Open (also known as the 19.com Northern Ireland Open) was a professional snooker tournament that took place from 11 to 17 November 2019 at the Waterfront Hall in Belfast, Northern Ireland. The fourth edition of the Northern Ireland Open, it was the sixth ranking event of the 2019–20 snooker season, the second tournament of the Home Nations Series. Featuring a prize fund of £405,000, the winner received £70,000. The event was broadcast on Eurosport and Quest domestically and was sponsored by betting company 19.com.

The defending champion was Judd Trump, who had defeated Ronnie O'Sullivan 9–7 in the 2018 final. The pair both reached the final in 2019, with Trump successfully defending the title, defeating O'Sullivan by the same scoreline. Stuart Bingham scored the highest  of the tournament, compiling a maximum break in the first frame of his first round match with Lu Ning, the sixth of his career.

Format

The Northern Ireland Open was first played in 2016, and was won by Mark King. The 2019 event was the second of four Home Nations Series events, and the sixth world ranking tournament of the 2019–20 snooker season. The event took place from 11 to 17 November 2019 at the Waterfront Hall in Belfast, Northern Ireland. and followed the World Open, and preceded the UK Championship.

The defending champion was Judd Trump, who had won the 2018 event by defeating Ronnie O'Sullivan 9–7. All matches were played as the best of 7  in the first four rounds, at which point the number increased: 9 in the quarter-finals; 11 in the semi-finals; and the best of 19 frames in the final. Chinese sports prediction website 19.com sponsored the event, which was broadcast in Europe and Australia by Eurosport; CCTV, Superstars Online, Youku and Zhibo.tv in China; True sport in Thailand; Sky Sports in New Zealand and DAZN in Canada.

Prize fund
The breakdown of prize money for the event is shown below:

 Winner: £70,000
 Runner-up: £30,000
 Semi-final: £20,000
 Quarter-final: £10,000
 Last 16: £7,500
 Last 32: £4,000
 Last 64: £3,000
 Highest break: £5,000
 Total: £405,000

Tournament summary

The first four rounds were played from 11 to 14 November as the best of seven frames. Defending champion Trump defeated James Cahill in the opening round, then beat three Chinese players Zhang Anda, Si Jiahui and Yan Bingtao, whilst unseeded player Anthony Hamilton defeated Tom Ford, Rod Lawler and eighth seed Kyren Wilson to reach the quarter-finals. Fifth seed Mark Selby defeated Xu Si, Matthew Stevens, Luca Brecel and Ken Doherty in qualifying for the quarter-finals where he would meet John Higgins as he defeated Chang Bingyu, Kacper Filipiak, Billy Joe Castle, and 2019 World Cup partner Stephen Maguire. Fourteenth seed Joe Perry defeated Zhao Xintong, Ross Bulman, Graeme Dott and Robbie Williams to play Alexander Ursenbacher in the quarter-finals, who overcame Xiao Guodong and Martin O'Donnell in the opening two rounds. In the third round, he met Stuart Bingham, who made the highest break of the event, a maximum break of 147 in the first frame of his opening round win over Lu Ning, the sixth of Bingham's career. Ursenbacher defeated Bingham 4–2, and then sixth seed Mark Allen 4–3. Seventh seed Shaun Murphy overcame Fraser Patrick, Luo Honghao, Ricky Walden and Barry Hawkins to meet Ronnie O'Sullivan, who defeated Oliver Lines, Lei Peifan, Stuart Carrington and Yuan Sijun.

The quarter-finals were played on 15 November as the best of nine frames. Trump defeated Hamilton 5–1, the same scoreline that O'Sullivan defeated Murphy, whilst Perry defeated Ursenbacher 5–3. Higgins led Selby 4–2, but led 66–0 in frame seven. Selby, however, took more than six minutes to take a single shot, more time than the fastest ever maximum break. Selby won the frame, and tied the match at 4–4, but Higgins won the deciding frame to win 5–4. The semi-finals were played as the best of 11 frames on 16 November. Higgins led Trump at 3–2 in the first, but Trump won the next four frames to progress to the final. The second semi-final was held between O'Sullivan and Perry. O'Sullivan won all of the first five frames, before winning the match 6–1.

The final was played between Trump and O'Sullivan on 17 November as the best of 17 frames, held over two . Trump won the opening two frames, and led 3–1 after a break of 123 in the fourth. He also led 5–3 after the opening session, despite missing an attempt for a maximum break in frame seven. Upon the restart, O'Sullivan won frame nine, before Trump opened up a three frame lead by winning the next two. O'Sullivan won two frames in a row, to trail by a frame, but Trump made a break of 124 to lead 8–6. Making his second century break of the final, a 135, O'Sullivan won frame 15, but Trump made a break of 84 to win the match 9–7.

The win was Trump's 14th ranking event victory. After the match, Trump commented: "To defend any title is always difficult but to do it against Ronnie [O'Sullivan] is extra special...You've got to play [your best] against Ronnie otherwise you lose." O'Sullivan praised his opponent after the match, commenting that he "enjoyed watching" Trump's play. The pair would also contest the following season's event, with Trump again winning over O'Sullivan by the same scoreline.

Main draw
The results from the event are shown below. Seeded players have their seedings in brackets. Players highlighted in bold denote match winners.

Qualifying round

 4–0  Robbie McGuigan

Top half

Section 1

Section 2

Section 3

Section 4

Bottom half

Section 5

Section 6

Section 7

Section 8

Finals

Final

Century breaks
A total of 76 century breaks were made during the competition. The highest break was a maximum break scored by Bingham in the first frame of his opening round win over Lu Ning.

 147  Stuart Bingham
 139, 132  Zhang Anda
 137, 114  Mark Joyce
 136, 134  Matthew Stevens
 136, 125, 124, 123, 122, 113, 111, 106, 106, 106, 105  Judd Trump
 136  Zhao Xintong
 135, 127, 126, 101  Ronnie O'Sullivan
 134  Joe Perry
 132  Sam Baird
 132  Ken Doherty
 130  Matthew Selt
 129, 127, 101  Yan Bingtao
 129, 119, 101  Barry Hawkins
 129  Tian Pengfei
 128, 113, 102  Luca Brecel
 126, 102  Liang Wenbo
 123  Scott Donaldson
 122, 104, 103  Shaun Murphy
 122  Thor Chuan Leong
 118, 103, 101, 101  Mark Allen
 118  Yuan Sijun
 117, 115, 112, 110  John Higgins
 116  Ricky Walden
 115, 109, 101  Mark Selby
 114, 101  Robbie Williams
 112  Jack Lisowski
 109  Billy Joe Castle
 109  Chen Zifan
 108  Zhou Yuelong
 107  Anthony Hamilton
 106  Ali Carter
 105  Chang Bingyu
 105  Luo Honghao
 105  Mitchell Mann
 104  Stuart Carrington
 103, 102  Alexander Ursenbacher
 102  Ben Woollaston
 101  Michael White
 100  Graeme Dott
 100  Lei Peifan
 100  Hammad Miah

References

Home Nations Series
2019
2019 in snooker
2019 in Northern Ireland sport
Sports competitions in Belfast
2010s in Northern Ireland
21st century in Belfast
November 2019 sports events in the United Kingdom